Imran Hermanovich Usmanov (2 March 1953 – 11 July 2017) was a Chechen music producer, song writer and folk singer whose deep baritone voice and songs about life are regarded as classics in Chechen music.

Born in 1953 to Chechen parents in Nozhay-Yurt, Chechnya, he graduated from Rostov-on-Don Music Teachers Training College. He is the eldest of two brothers; Ilman and Nazar.

In April 2004, Imran announced that he would compose music to educate children on the danger of land mines.

His final appointment was as Director of Chechnya's Philharmonic Society.

References

External links
Chechnya Free.ru Biographical article
Prague Watchdog article
Doshdu Magazine article

1953 births
2017 deaths
Chechen male singers
20th-century Russian male singers
20th-century Russian singers
Russian people of Chechen descent